Steven Machat (born October 18, 1952) is an American entertainment mogul, lawyer, and the producer of Bird on a Wire, the documentary film of the Leonard Cohen 1972 European tour.

Biography
Machat was born in Manhattan, New York. His father, entertainment lawyer Marty Machat, was known for representing artists such as Phil Spector, Sam Cooke, and The Rolling Stones. He attended University of Miami as an undergraduate, where he studied accounting, and then attended Vanderbilt University Law School.

Machat has been a worldwide entertainment attorney, music publisher, manager of music talent, and record label owner as well as film producer, among other commercial endeavors. His clients have included Electric Light Orchestra, Genesis, Peter Gabriel, Phil Collins, Ready for the World, Leonard Cohen, Phil Spector, Stacey Jackson, Snoop Dogg, New Edition, Bobby Brown, Manu DiBango, Rita Lee, and new artists from Sweden, Yung Lean and The Sad Boys.

In London, Machat wrote the book Gods, Gangsters and Honour, filled with stories about the celebrities he worked for. Machat wrote the book to share the light he discovered handling the careers of many of the top icons of the music industry. The first edition of the book was published in the UK by Beautiful Books Limited (UK) in August 2009.

Machat lectured across Europe and the United Kingdom at universities, including both Oxford University and Cambridge University, as well as at musical festivals and book fairs.

Steven Machat lost his son Barron, the co-founder of the record label Hippos in Tanks, in a car accident in April 2015.

In 2021 Machat announced his return to the music industry with a new label SSK Music Orbit and the signings of Roxx Revolt and the Velvets and an eclectic album by the legendary Bob Daisley who has previously worked with, among many others including, Gary Moore, Rainbow and Ozzy Osbourne.

Background 
Machat has a traditional law background; he graduated from Vanderbilt Law School and University of Miami Business School. At Vanderbilt, he got his feet wet in the real legal system as a public defender in Davidson County, Tennessee for 2 years. He started his commercial career in 1978 as a law partner with his father the late Marty Machat at their law firm Machat & Machat in New York, Los Angeles, & London.

Machat has ventured into the creative and business process of theatre, movies, and movie soundtracks.  These include "Elvis", West London Production, "Private Lives" with Elizabeth Taylor, Flashdance, Streetfighter, Judge Dredd, Stan Lee Properties, HOPE an album with the Dali Lama dedicated to Peace, and the award-winning musical documentary Bird on a Wire about Leonard Cohen's travels from Dublin, Ireland to Tel Aviv, Israel.  Steven’s latest film Saving The Motherland is an epic Russian WW2 drama centered around the Battle of Stalingrad .  Next up is the Climate Live documentary in which Steven draws into sharp focus the irretrievable damage mankind has inflicted on the planet.

Steven has written 9 books: Highways of Man – The Odyssey Almanac; Man, Community & Living The American Dream; Gods, Gangsters and Honor: A Rock 'n' Roll Odyssey; Sacred Knowledge, A Rock 'n' Roller's Guide to Higher Consciousness, Spiritual Insomnia, The Colonization of Earth, The Making of Man, The Creation of Ozzy, The History of Viruses and Taking Jesus off The Cross .

In 2016 Steven ran for the US Senate as an independent in Florida .  In 2018 he ran for Congress in Florida’s 26th District as a progressive Democrat . His Press Secretary in 2018, who was in charge of his campaign in 2016 in Tampa, was the activist/writer Al R Suarez.

References

1952 births
Living people
Film producers from New York (state)
American music publishers (people)
Record producers from New York (state)
American people of Jewish descent
American entertainment lawyers
People from Manhattan
University of Miami Business School alumni
Vanderbilt University Law School alumni